Kandagallu (also known as Kandagal) is a village in Davangere taluk, Karnataka, South India. The population is approximately 5,000

To the west, of the village there is a small lake with the historic Sri Kalleshwara Temple at the center. It is 30 kilometers from Davangere city, and there is bus service between the two towns.

Education
Schooling is up to 10th Class, with three schools Kannada and English Medium, the (1)Government Higher Primary School,(2) sri Lingeshwara Higher Primary School which covers first through seventh standards, and the Sri H Siddaveerappa High School, which covers eighth through tenth standards. Students who want to continue their education must go to Davangere.

Surrounding area

This village is partly surrounded by the Haridravathi River, a tributary of the Tunga Bhadra River which flows 365 days of a year, providing water for farming, drinking water.

Life Style
Subgroups within the population of the village are Veerashaiva Lingayat, Jangama,Valmiki Nayakas, Brahmanas, S.C, S.T, kumbara, Vishwakarma and Muslims, although the majority are  Veerashaiva Lingayats and Valmiki Nayakas.

The majority of the population are farmers. Only 45% of the people are vegetarians, rest of them are non vegetarians. Typical dishes eaten here include Jolada Mudde, Jolada Rotti, Rice & Saambar, Ragi Mudde, Chapathi,Milk and Curd. Breakfast items such as Pulao, Rice Bath,Upma,lemon rice, Avalakki, Poori, Idli, Paddu,Dosa, Thalipattu and Mandakki are eaten.

Many people buy local Kannada news papers Janathavaani, Prajavaani, Vijaya karnataka, Vijayavani, Deccan Herald and Times of India.

There is a government sponsored library in the village.

Culture
The village's main festival, Rathothsava, honours Sri Veerabhadreshwara is celebrated 9 days after the Ugadi festival. The other festivals celebrated here are Deepavali (Diwali), Ugadi, Sri Ganesha Chathurthi, Basava Jayanthi, Shravana Masa pooja  & Maheshwarana Jathre, Maha Shivarathri.
Each festival has significant meaning.

Sports, such as chess, volleyball, cricket, badminton, kabaddi, and kho kho, are the most common games.

References

Villages in Davanagere district